Jules Lebreton (7 May 1890 – 20 January 1982) was a French racing cyclist. He rode in the 1921 Tour de France.

References

1890 births
1982 deaths
French male cyclists
Place of birth missing